Larry Owens (born January 8, 1983) is an American professional basketball player. He played college basketball for Yavapai College and Oral Roberts University.

College career

Yavapai College (2001–2003)
Owens averaged 22.7 points and 10.6 rebounds per game as a sophomore at Yavapai College. In 2003, he was named in the second team NJCAA All-American and the ACCAC 
MVP.

Following his sophomore season, he transferred to Oral Roberts University.

Oral Roberts (2004–2006)
After sitting out the 2003–04 season due to NCAA transfer rules, Owens joined the Golden Eagles for his redshirted junior season in 2004–05. He was named in the Mid-Con All-Newcomer team 
after outstanding first season. In 33 games, he averaged 9.2 points, 7.5 rebounds, 2.5 assists, 1.8 steals and 1.0 blocks per game.

In his senior season, he was named in the 2006 All-MCC first team as well as being named the 2006 All-MCC Defensive Player of the Year. In 33 games, he averaged 12.5 points, 7.9 rebounds, 3.2 assists, 1.5 steals and 1.2 blocks per game.

Professional career

2006–07 season
Owens went undrafted in the 2006 NBA draft. He was later drafted by the Mississippi Hardhats of the World Basketball Association (WBA). He left the Hardhats after pre-season. He then moved to Stade Clermontois BA of France for the 2006–07 season.

2007–08 season
Owens joined the Miami Heat for the 2007 NBA Summer League. Later that year, he signed with Liège Basket of Belgium for the 2007–08 season.

2008–09 season
Owens joined the New Orleans Hornets for the 2008 NBA Summer League. Later that year, he re-signed with Liège Basket for the 2008–09 season.

2009–10 season
Owens re-joined the New Orleans Hornets for the 2009 NBA Summer League. On September 28, 2009, he signed with the Hornets. However, he was later waived by the Hornets on October 21, 2009. On November 1, 2009, he was acquired by the Tulsa 66ers.

2010–11 season
Owens joined the NBA D-League Select team for the 2010 NBA Summer League. He later signed with Türk Telekom B.K. of Turkey but left before the playing in a game for them. On October 30, 2010, he was re-acquired by the Tulsa 66ers.

On January 16, 2011, he signed with the San Antonio Spurs on a 10-day contract. He made his NBA debut on that same day against the Denver Nuggets, picking up an assist and a rebound in two minutes of playing time. On January 26, 2011, Owens signed a second 10-day contract with the Spurs. After his second 10-day contract expired, he re-joined the Tulsa 66ers.

On April 6, 2011, he signed with Washington Wizards for the remainder of the 2010–11 season.

2011–12 season
On December 10, 2011, Owens re-signed with the Wizards. However, he was later waived by the Wizards on December 21, 2011. On December 28, he was re-acquired by the Tulsa 66ers.

On January 18, 2012, he signed with the New Jersey Nets. On January 31, 2012, he was waived by the Nets. On February 4, he returned to the 66ers.

2012–13 season
Owens joined the Boston Celtics for the 2012 NBA Summer League. In August 2012, he joined BCM Gravelines of France but left after pre-season. In September 2012, he had a try-out with Budivelnyk Kyiv of the Ukraine but was not signed. In November 2012, he signed with JDA Dijon Basket France for the 2012–13 season.

2013–14 season
On October 31, 2013, he was re-acquired by the Tulsa 66ers. On December 19, 2013, he was traded to the Iowa Energy.

2014–15 season
On August 27, 2014, Owens signed with Halcones Rojos Veracruz of Mexico for the 2014–15 LNBP season. In November 2014, he left the team after appearing in 13 games. On January 3, 2015, he was reacquired by the Iowa Energy.

2015–16 season
On August 12, 2015, Owens signed with Kyoto Hannaryz of the Japanese bj league.

Owens competes for Team 23 in The Basketball Tournament. He was a forward on the 2015 team who made it to the $1 million championship game, falling 67-65 to Overseas Elite.

NBA career statistics

Regular season

|-
| style="text-align:left;"| 
| style="text-align:left;"| San Antonio
| 7 || 0 || 4.4 || .500 || .333 || .500 || .6 || .1 || .3 || .0 || 1.3
|-
| style="text-align:left;"| 
| style="text-align:left;"| Washington
| 5 || 0 || 22.4 || .462 || .500 || .400 || 2.2 || 1.4 || 1.4 || 1.0 || 6.2
|-
| style="text-align:left;"| 
| style="text-align:left;"| New Jersey
| 7 || 0 || 10.7 || .364 || .400 || .750 || 1.9 || .6 || .0 || .1 || 1.9
|- class="sortbottom"
| style="text-align:center;" colspan="2"| Career
| 19 || 0 || 11.5 || .442 || .444 || .538 || 1.5 || 0.6 || 0.5 || .3 || 2.8

References

External links
NBA D-League Profile
ESPN.com Profile
Basketball-Reference.com Profile
Sports-Reference.com Profile
Oral Roberts bio

1983 births
Living people
American expatriate basketball people in Belgium
American expatriate basketball people in France
American expatriate basketball people in Japan
American expatriate basketball people in Mexico
American men's basketball players
Basketball players from Arizona
Halcones Rojos Veracruz players
Iowa Energy players
JDA Dijon Basket players
Junior college men's basketball players in the United States
Kyoto Hannaryz players
Liège Basket players
New Jersey Nets players
Nishinomiya Storks players
Oral Roberts Golden Eagles men's basketball players
San Antonio Spurs players
Shooting guards
Small forwards
Tulsa 66ers players
Undrafted National Basketball Association players
Washington Wizards players
Yavapai College alumni